Nous, princesses de Clèves is a French documentary film directed by Régis Sauder, filmed at the Lycée Diderot and released on 3 March 2011.

Synopsis
The movie follows the thoughts and emotions of various teenagers as they prepare to take their Baccalauréat by reading the classic 1678 French novel, La Princesse de Clèves. The film highlights the differences and connections between the lives of the students, many of which are from immigrant and working-class families, and the passions and plots of the 17th century French court.

Festivals and awards
The film was screened at different film festivals throughout the world, including: 2011 Doc à Tunis - Tunis; 2011 Docudays - Beirut International Documentary Festival - Beyrouth (Liban); 2011 RIDM - Rencontres Internationales du Documentaire de Montréal - Montréal (Canada); 2011 SFFF - San Francisco International Film Festival - San Francisco (États-Unis); 2011 Visions du Réel - Nyon (Suisse), ... and received the 2011 Étoile de la Scam.

Selected cast
Sarah Yagoubi as herself
Abou Achoumi as himself
Laura Badrane as herself
Morgane Badrane as herself	
Manel Boulaabi as herself
Virginie Da Vega as herself
Thérèse Demarque as herself

References

External links
 

2011 films
Films based on works by Madame de La Fayette
2010s French-language films
French documentary films
2011 documentary films
2010s French films